The 1978–79 season was the 77th season in which Dundee competed at a Scottish national level, playing in the First Division for the third straight season. In another tight title race, Dundee would prevail and win both promotion back to the top tier and the First Division title. Dundee would also compete in both the Scottish League Cup and the Scottish Cup, where they would be eliminated by Celtic in the 1st round of the League Cup, and by Rangers in the quarter-finals of the Scottish Cup.

Scottish First Division 

Statistics provided by Dee Archive.

League table

Scottish League Cup 

Statistics provided by Dee Archive.

Scottish Cup 

Statistics provided by Dee Archive.

Player statistics 
Statistics provided by Dee Archive

|}

See also 

 List of Dundee F.C. seasons

References

External links 

 1978-79 Dundee season on Fitbastats

Dundee F.C. seasons
Dundee